The Fort à la Corne kimberlite field is a 104- to 95-million-year-old diamond-bearing kimberlite field in east-central Saskatchewan, Canada. Its kimberlite pipes are among the most complete examples in the world, preserving maar-shaped craters.

See also
List of volcanoes in Canada
Volcanism of Canada
Volcanism of Western Canada

References

Maars of Canada
Diatremes of Canada
Volcanoes of Saskatchewan
Cretaceous volcanoes
Geology of Saskatchewan
Volcanic fields of Canada